The Khentei Range is a mountain range in the Transbaikal Region (Zabaykalsky Krai) of Siberia, Russia.

The range is part of the Trans-Baikal conifer forests ecoregion. The Sokhondo Nature Reserve is located in the area of the range.

Geography
The Khentei Range is part of the Khentei-Daur Highlands, South Siberian System. It rises on the right bank of the upper course of the Ingoda River and stretches roughly northeastwards for over  until the source of the Bylir River, where it joins with the Stanovik Range. Its southern spurs connect with the Onon-Baldzhin Range and in the west with the Pereval Range. 

Other important peaks are Buryktyn-Yang and Uluri Golets. The relief is marked by a strong degree of horizontal and vertical dissection with numerous faults. Scree slopes and cliffs are common throughout the range. In some places there are traces of Pleistocene glaciation and lakes of glacial origin.

Flora
The slopes of the range are covered with mountain taiga and pre-Alpine forest. The higher elevations have dwarf cedar shrub and are often crowned by "golets" type bare and largely rocky summits.

See also
Sokhondo Nature Reserve

References

Mountain ranges of Russia
Khentei-Daur Highlands